Stoudt's Brewery was a microbrewery and restaurant located in the Lancaster County borough of Adamstown. It was one of the commonwealth's first microbreweries, having been started in 1987 by Ed and Carol Stoudt. The brewery closed in 2020, after Carol Stoudt's retirement. The restaurant, Stoudts Black Angus Restaurant and Pub, was in business for half a century.

Beers
Beers regularly available at Stoudt's Brewery include a pils, a Munich-style pale lager, an 
American pale ale, and "Scarlet Lady Ale", an English-style ale.  Heavier offerings include "Triple", a Belgian-abbey style ale, an American-style double IPA, and Fat Dog Stout, a British-style stout.  Stoudt's also offers seasonal beers.

References

Beer brewing companies based in Pennsylvania
Tourist attractions in Lancaster County, Pennsylvania
1987 establishments in Pennsylvania
2020 disestablishments in Pennsylvania